The 1991 Kentucky Wildcats football team represented the University of Kentucky in the Southeastern Conference (SEC) during the 1991 NCAA Division I-A football season.  In their second season under head coach Bill Curry, the Wildcats compiled a 3–8 record (0–7 against SEC opponents), finished in last place in the SEC, and were outscored by their opponents, 268 to 190.  The team played its home games in Commonwealth Stadium in Lexington, Kentucky.

The team's statistical leaders included Pookie Jones with 954 passing yards, Terry Samuels with 307 rushing yards, and Neal Clark with 647 receiving yards.

Schedule

References

Kentucky
Kentucky Wildcats football seasons
Kentucky Wildcats football